James Romulus Campbell (May 4, 1853 – August 12, 1924) was a U.S. Representative from Illinois.

Biography
Born near McLeansboro, Hamilton County, Illinois, to John L. and Mary Ainsworth (Coker) Campbell, he attended the public schools and the University of Notre Dame, Notre Dame, Indiana. He studied law. He was admitted to the bar in 1877 and commenced practice in McLeansboro, Illinois. He owned and edited the McLeansboro Times 1870-1898. He served as member of the State house of representatives 1884-1888. He served in the State senate 1888-1896.

Campbell was elected as a Democrat to the Fifty-fifth Congress (March 4, 1897 – March 3, 1899). He was not a candidate for reelection to the Fifty-sixth Congress in 1898. He served in the war with Spain in the Ninth Regiment, Illinois Volunteer Infantry. Commissioned colonel June 28, 1898. After the muster out of that regiment was appointed lieutenant colonel of the Thirtieth Regiment, United States Volunteers, on July 5, 1899, and assigned to service in the Philippine Islands. Commissioned brigadier general of Volunteers January 3, 1901, and was honorably discharged March 25, 1901. He engaged in milling and banking in McLeansboro, Illinois, and died there August 12, 1924. He was interred in Odd Fellows Cemetery.

References

1853 births
1924 deaths
Businesspeople from Illinois
Democratic Party Illinois state senators
Democratic Party members of the Illinois House of Representatives
People from McLeansboro, Illinois
University of Notre Dame alumni
Union Army generals
Democratic Party members of the United States House of Representatives from Illinois
Military personnel from Illinois